Florence G. Hayes (1944 – 27 June 2014) was an Irish Gaelic footballer who played as a left corner-forward for the Cork senior football team.

Born in Clonakilty, County Cork, Hayes first played competitive football during his schooling at St. Mary's College. He arrived on the inter-county scene at the age of seventeen when he first linked up with the Cork minor team, before later joining the under-21 side. He made his senior debut during the 1964 championship. Hayes went on to play a key role over the next few years and won two Munster medals. He was an All-Ireland runner-up on one occasion.

Hayes was a member of the Munster inter-provincial team on a number of occasions, however, he never won a Railway Cup medal. At club level he enjoyed a decade-long career in both codes with Clonakilty.

HIs brother, Tim F. Hayes, also played football for Cork.

Throughout his inter-county career, Hayes made 12 championship appearances for Cork. His retirement came following the conclusion of the 1969 championship.

Honours

Team

Clonakilty
West Cork Junior A Hurling Championship (2): 1961, 1962

Cork
Munster Senior Football Championship (2): 1966, 1967
All-Ireland Minor Football Championship (1): 1961
Munster Minor Football Championship (1): 1961

References

1944 births
2014 deaths
Clonakilty Gaelic footballers
Clonakilty hurlers
Cork inter-county Gaelic footballers
Munster inter-provincial Gaelic footballers